Chong Yong-man (born 8 January 1970) is a North Korean former footballer. He represented North Korea on at least fourteen occasions between 1989 and 1990.

Career statistics

International

References

1970 births
Living people
North Korean footballers
North Korea international footballers
Association football defenders
Footballers at the 1990 Asian Games
Asian Games competitors for North Korea